Manassas Park is an independent city in the U.S. state of Virginia. As of the 2020 census, the population was 17,219. Manassas Park is bordered by the city of Manassas and Prince William County.
Manassas Park is a part of the Washington-Arlington-Alexandria, DC-VA-MD-WV Metropolitan Statistical Area.

History
During the American Civil War, the Manassas Park area was used as a campsite by the Confederate States Army during both the First and Second Battles of Bull Run.

Manassas Park was created as a subdivision of Prince William County, with the first houses being constructed in 1955. In 1957, Manassas Park was incorporated as a town. Approximately 600 acres of land was annexed by the town of Manassas Park in 1974, and the town was incorporated as a city independent from the county the next year in 1975. Since then, it has been Virginia's newest city.

Geography
Manassas Park is located at  (38.771944, -77.45250). It is roughly dumbbell-shaped and lies to the south of Bull Run. It is longest NW–SE along Manassas Drive, and is bisected by Virginia State Route 28 at its narrowest section.

Adjacent county / Independent city
 Prince William County, Virginia - north, east, south
 Manassas, Virginia - west, southwest

Demographics

2020 census

Note: the US Census treats Hispanic/Latino as an ethnic category. This table excludes Latinos from the racial categories and assigns them to a separate category. Hispanics/Latinos can be of any race.

2000 census

At the 2000 census there were 10,290 people, 3,254 households and 2,557 families in the city. The racial makeup of the city was 72.79% White, 11.17% African American, 0.44% Native American, 4.06% Asian, 0.07% Pacific Islander, 8.14% from other races, and 3.33% from two or more races. Hispanic or Latino of any race were 15.00%.

Of the 3,254 households 45.4% had children under the age of 18 living with them, 59.9% were married couples living together, 12.1% had a female householder with no husband present, and 21.4% were non-families. 14.4% of households were one person and 2.6% were one person aged 65 or older.  The average household size was 3.16 and the average family size was 3.47.

The age distribution was 31.0% under the age of 18, 8.7% from 18 to 24, 40.1% from 25 to 44, 15.9% from 45 to 64, and 4.3% 65 or older.  The median age was 30 years. For every 100 females, there were 103.8 males.  For every 100 females age 18 and over, there were 103.0 males.

The median household income was $60,794 and the median family income  was $61,075. Males had a median income of $38,643 versus $30,942 for females. The per capita income for the city was $21,048.  About 4.7% of families and 5.2% of the population were below the poverty line, including 5.8% of those under age 18 and 11.2% of those age 65 or over.

In June 2021, U.S. News & World Report ranked Manassas Park with the fifth best life expectancy in the United States at 92.5 years old.

Education
The city is served by Manassas Park City Schools, with a total of 4 schools: Cougar Elementary, Manassas Park Elementary, Manassas Park Middle, and Manassas Park High School. There are also Private Schools.

Transportation

Virginia State Route 28 is the main highway serving the city. From Manassas Park, SR 28 extends north to Interstate 66 and south to Virginia State Route 234, providing connections to major cities through the region.

Virginia State Route 213 follows Manassas Drive, serving as a main roadway within Manassas Park. However, the route designation is unsigned.

The city is home to Manassas Park station located on the Manassas Line of the Virginia Railway Express.

Notable people
 Johnny Micheal Spann (1969–2001), was an employee of the Central Intelligence Agency (CIA) and the first American killed in combat after the U.S. invasion of Afghanistan.

References

External links
 City of Manassas Park
 Virginia Railway Express

 
Cities in Virginia
Majority-minority counties and independent cities in Virginia
Populated places established in 1955